The USA Cycling Professional Tour was a professional road bicycle racing series organized by USA Cycling.

Results

References

External links
 USA Cycling Pro Tour official website

Cycle racing in the United States